Dorcadion bangi is a species of beetle in the family Cerambycidae. It was described by Heyden in 1894.

Subspecies
 Dorcadion bangi bangi Heyden, 1894
 Dorcadion bangi heinzorum Braun, 1975
 Dorcadion bangi roridum Pesarini & Sabbadini, 1998

References

bangi
Beetles described in 1894